The 1967 New Mexico Lobos football team was an American football team that represented the University of New Mexico in the Western Athletic Conference (WAC) during the 1967 NCAA University Division football season.  In their eighth season under head coach Bill Weeks, the Lobos compiled a 1–9 record (0–5 against WAC opponents) and were outscored, 433 to 152.

Jim Boller and Rex Hennington were the team captains. The team's statistical leaders included Terry Stone with 1,946 passing yards, David Bookert with 671 rushing yards, and Ace Hendricks with 1,094 receiving yards and 36 points scored.

Schedule

References

New Mexico
New Mexico Lobos football seasons
New Mexico Lobos football